Nicholas James Christopher Lowther, 2nd Viscount Ullswater  (born 9 January 1942), is a British hereditary peer and former member of the House of Lords who sat as a Conservative. He succeeded his great-grandfather in the viscountcy of Ullswater in 1949, being one of very few peers to have succeeded a great-grandfather in a title.

He served as a whip and a minister under Margaret Thatcher and John Major between 1989 and 1995 culminating in serving as the Minister of State for Housing from 1994 to 1995.

Early life
Lowther was the son of John Lowther (1910–1942), and Priscilla Lambert (1917–1945). His father was secretary to HRH The Duke of Kent, who served as best man at their 1937 wedding. His father died alongside the Duke in the Dunbeath air crash. 

Lowther was educated at Eton College and Trinity College, Cambridge.

Political career
Lowther was made a Lord-in-waiting (whip) in January 1989 by Margaret Thatcher before becoming Parliamentary Under Secretary of State at the Department of Employment in July 1990. He was retained by John Major in that role until 1993, when he became Captain of the Honourable Corps of Gentlemen at Arms (Government Chief Whip in the House of Lords). He remained in this role for a year. He became Minister of State for Housing at the Department of the Environment (as well as a Privy Counsellor) in 1994, but left the Government in a 1995 reshuffle.

Princess Margaret
In 1998, he was appointed Private Secretary to Princess Margaret, Countess of Snowdon, and continued in this office until her death in 2002. He was appointed Lieutenant of the Royal Victorian Order in the special Honours List issued by the Queen after the Princess's death.

Return to politics
As a member of a Royal Household he could not take part in partisan politics and did not seek to remain in the House of Lords when the House of Lords Act 1999 was passed. But after the death of the Viscount of Oxfuird in January 2003, he won the all-house by-election, enabling him to return to the House of Lords.

On 22 May 2006, Lord Ullswater was nominated for the newly created post of Lord Speaker, and in the election held on 28 June 2006 emerged in third place out of nine candidates. He served as one of the Deputy Speakers in the Lords until May 2020; from June 2020 until May 2021, he served as Deputy Chairman of Committees. His great-grandfather, James Lowther, served as Speaker of the House of Commons 1905–1921.

Ullswater retired from the House of Lords on 20 July 2022.

Other interests
Lord Ullswater is the Chairman of Lonsdale Settled Estates Ltd and a Director of Lowther Trustees Limited, both companies that manage the family landholdings in Cumbria.

Arms

Personal life
Lord Ullswater was an amateur jockey in his youth.

In 1967, he married Susan Weatherby. The couple has two sons and two daughters:
Hon. Emma Mary Lowther, (b. 1968)
Hon. Clare Priscilla Lowther, (b. 1970)
Hon. Benjamin James Lowther (b. 1975)
Hon. Edward John Lowther (b. 1981)

The family lives at Docking in Norfolk.

References

1942 births
Alumni of Trinity College, Cambridge
People educated at Eton College
Conservative Party (UK) Baronesses- and Lords-in-Waiting
Honourable Corps of Gentlemen at Arms
Lieutenants of the Royal Victorian Order
Living people
Members of the Privy Council of the United Kingdom
People educated at West Downs School
Viscounts in the Peerage of the United Kingdom
Nicholas
Ullswater
Ullswater